The 2009 International Challenge Cup (also called the AEGON Challenge Cup after its title sponsor) was held between March 4 and 8, 2009 at the De Uithof in The Hague. Skaters competed in the disciplines of men's singles, ladies' singles, and pair skating, across the levels of senior, junior, novice, and the pre-novice discipline called "Debs".

Senior results

Men

Ladies

Junior results

Men

Ladies

Novice results

Boys

Girls

Pairs

Debs results

Boys

Girls

External links
 2009 International Challenge Cup (Archived 2009-07-28)

International Challenge Cup, 2009
Figure skating in the Netherlands